Trexler Historic District, also known as Trexler Station, is a national historic district located in Albany Township, Berks County, Pennsylvania.  The district encompasses 15 contributing buildings in the village of Trexler. It is a collection of homes and commercial buildings erected between 1790 and 1930.  Notable buildings include the 3-story, log Georgian style Ritter House (1790); Amos Trexler House (1886); 1 1/2-story log house (c. 1800); Trexler General Store (1890); cider mill (c. 1850); 3-story, frame storage building (1917); and Nathan Trexler House (1875). The Ritter House one housed an inn and tavern known as the Washington Inn. Also in the district is the separately listed Bridge in Albany Township.

It was listed on the National Register of Historic Places in 2001.

References

Historic districts on the National Register of Historic Places in Pennsylvania
Colonial Revival architecture in Pennsylvania
Georgian architecture in Pennsylvania
Houses completed in 1790
Historic districts in Berks County, Pennsylvania
National Register of Historic Places in Berks County, Pennsylvania